Kothirapatti   is a village in the Annavasalrevenue block of Pudukkottai district, Tamil Nadu, India.

Demographics 

, Kothirapatti  had a total population of 3348 with 1667 males and 1681 females. Out of the total population, 1973 people were literate.

References

Villages in Pudukkottai district